The bare area of the liver (nonperitoneal area) is a large triangular area on the diaphragmatic surface of the liver. It is the only part of the liver with no peritoneal covering, although it is still covered by Glisson’s capsule. It is attached directly to the diaphragm by loose connective tissue. The bare area of the liver is relevant to the portacaval anastomosis, encloses the right extraperitoneal subphrenic space, and can be a site of spread of infection from the abdominal cavity to the thoracic cavity

Structure 
The bare area of the liver is found on the posterosuperior surface of the right lobe of the liver. This lies close to the thoracic diaphragm. It is the only part of the liver that has no peritoneal covering. It lies between the two layers of the coronary ligament, as well as the right triangular ligament. The coronary ligament represents reflections of the visceral peritoneum covering the liver onto the diaphragm.

The bare area of the liver is attached to the thoracic diaphragm by loose connective tissue. It touches the bottom surface of the diaphragm. It is also not covered in capsule.

Clinical significance 
The bare area of the liver is clinically important because of the portacaval anastomosis. It is a site where infection can spread from the abdominal cavity to the thoracic cavity. It encloses the right extraperitoneal subphrenic space.

History 
The bare area of the liver may also be known as the nonperitoneal area.

References

Additional images

External links 
  - "Stomach, Spleen and Liver: Ligaments of the Liver"
 

Liver anatomy